Tim & Eric's Bedtime Stories (also known as Bedtime Stories) is an American horror comedy television series on Adult Swim. Tim & Eric's Bedtime Stories was created by Tim Heidecker and Eric Wareheim of the comedy duo Tim & Eric, who have been working with the network for several years with various shows and projects. The pilot episode aired on October 31, 2013, and the series officially premiered on September 18, 2014.

Production
According to the network, the series would mark a stylistic departure from the duo's previous Adult Swim show, Tim and Eric Awesome Show, Great Job!, instead being formatted as an anthology series. Initial reports indicated that the series would have a quarter-hour running time. Reviewers, the network and Heidecker have commented that the series is inspired by The Twilight Zone, with the latter stating they will explore "different genres and different tropes" in the anthology format.

The series' pilot aired midnight, October 31, 2013, as a Halloween special. According to Heidecker, the pilot was produced in the same year that it aired, and the show had not been produced yet, waiting to start production toward the end of the year.

On May 7, 2015, two new half-hour episodes were announced to be in production. They aired in the fall of 2015.

On June 16, 2016 Tim Heidecker announced in an interview that Season 2, consisting of at least six full 30 minute episodes, would be aired in 2017.

Season 2 premiered on September 10, 2017. On October 3, 2018, Heidecker implied on Twitter that a third season was unlikely. As of January 2020, there has been no announcement of a third season.

Episodes

Pilot (2013)

Season 1 (2014)

Specials (2015)

Season 2 (2017)

References

Further reading

External links
 
 

2010s American horror comedy television series
2010s American surreal comedy television series
2014 American television series debuts
2017 American television series endings
Adult Swim original programming
2010s American anthology television series
English-language television shows
Television series by Abso Lutely Productions
Television series by Williams Street
Tim & Eric